Federal Medical Centre, Nguru is a federal government of Nigeria medical centre located in Nguru, Yobe State, Nigeria. The current medical director is Professor Hadiza Usman.

MD 
The current medical director is Professor Hadiza Usman.

References 

Hospitals in Nigeria